TimAir is a charter airline based at the Sangster International Airport, Montego Bay, Jamaica.

History
TimAir Limited was established in 1991 by Timothy Moxon as one of Jamaica's first "air taxi" services, providing air services for visitors to the island, as well as to the local business community. The airline was purchased in 1991 by Fraser McConnell.

Fleet

 1 Britten-Norman BN-2 Islander - 9 passengers
 6 Cessna 206 - 5 passengers

External links
 

Airlines of Jamaica
Airlines established in 1983